This is the first edition of the tournament as part of the WTA 125K Series.
Gabriela Cé and Verónica Cepede Royg won the title, defeating Oksana Kalashnikova and Tatjana Maria in the final 1–6, 6–4, [10–8].

Seeds

Draw

External links 
 Draw

2015 WTA 125K series
Southern California Open